The Basque Cup, more commonly known as Euskal Kopa, is the regional preseason basketball cup competition that has been organized by the Basque Basketball Federation since 2011, in the Basque Country, Spain.

Nowadays, the teams that play in this preseason cup competition are the Liga ACB, LEB Oro, LEB Plata and Liga EBA teams.

Performance by club

Euskal Kopa history

2010–11 Euskal Kopa

2011–12 Euskal Kopa

2012–13 Euskal Kopa

2013–14 Euskal Kopa

2014–15 Euskal Kopa

2015–16 Euskal Kopa

Group A

Group B

Final

2016–17 Euskal Kopa

Euskal Kopa LEB

Source: FEB.es

Euskal Kopa EBA

Final

Source: FEB.es

2017–18 Euskal Kopa

Euskal Kopa ACB

Source: BasketBasko

Euskal Kopa LEB

Euskal Kopa EBA

Final

Source: FEB.es

2018–19 Euskal Kopa

Euskal Kopa

Source: FEB.es, BasketBasko, BasketBasko

Euskal Kopa EBA

Final

Source: BasketBasko

2019 Euskal Kopa

Euskal Kopa ACB

Source: BasketBasko

Euskal Kopa LEB

Source: BasketBasko

Euskal Kopa EBA

Group A

Group B

Final

Source: BasketBasko

2020 Euskal Kopa

Euskal Kopa ACB

2021 Euskal Kopa

Euskal Kopa ACB

Notes

External links
 Basque Basketball Federation website 

Basketball cup competitions in Spain
Basque Country (autonomous community)